Sailing/Yachting is an Olympic sport starting from the Games of the 1st Olympiad (1896 Olympics in Athens, Greece). With the exception of 1904 and the canceled 1916 Summer Olympics, sailing has always been included on the Olympic schedule. The Sailing program of 1972 consisted of a total of six sailing classes (disciplines). For each class seven races were scheduled from 29 August 1972 to 8 September 1972 of the coast of Kiel-Schilksee in the Bay of Kiel. Kiel hosted the Olympic sailing competitions for the second time, having previously done so during the 1936 Summer Olympics. The sailing was done on the triangular type Olympic courses.

Venue 

According to the IOC statutes the contests in all sport disciplines must be held either in, or as close as possible to the city which the IOC has chosen. Among others, an exception is made for the Olympic yachting events, which customarily must be staged on the open sea. On account of this principle, immediately after it became known that the city of Munich had the intention of hosting the Games of the XXth Olympiad, the cities of Kiel and Lübeck competed for the honor to carry out the Olympic yachting regattas.

Kiel-Schilksee (Olympiazentrum) 
When Kiel (and the Kieler Yacht-Club) won the competition the following was decided:
 a yachting center would be built in Kiel/Schilksee that, as was the case with the sport facilities in Munich, must be usable after the period of the Olympic Games as a future sports center;
 the city of Kiel will conduct a building competition for the Olympic Center in Kiel-Schilksee as soon as possible;
 the OC will form a committee for the Olympic yachting events to coordinate all contingencies arising in Kiel, and will in addition create a corresponding full-time organization of the OC in Kiel in order to handle the necessary work and activities in Kiel on schedule.
During the Games the number of spectators and visitors at the Olympic events in Kiel and at the Olympic Center in Kiel-Schilksee exceeded the expectations by a large margin. Conservative estimates put the total number at about a million spectators and visitors in Kiel.

Course areas 
A total of three race areas were set in the Firth of Kiel of the coast of Kiel/Schilksee.
The location points to the center of the 2 nm radius circle for course area A & B and to a 1.5 nm radius circle for course area C.

Competition

Overview

Continents 
 Asia
 Oceania
 Europe
 Americas

Countries

Classes (equipment)

Race schedule

Medal summary

Medal table

Notes

Munich 
Because of the distance to Munich and the fact that no sailing was scheduled for 6 and 7 September, the killings of 11 Israeli athletes had less impact on sailing than it had on the other events in Munich. Only a few of the sailing teams did not start at the last day of the races, among them the Israelian Flying Dutchman team of Yair Michaeli and Izchak Nir.

Other information

Sailing 
 This Olympic sailing event was gender independent, but turned out to be a Men-only event. This was one of the triggers to create gender specific events. This however had to wait until 1988.
 Some sources state the Finn event as a designated men-only event. The Official report of the games does not mention this gender specific discriminator,
 It was the first Olympic sailing contest where only "One Design" classes were used. Also none of the classes was "owned by one builder". In general more than one builder was allowed. (The boats had to apply to what we now call open standards).
 Paul Elvstrøm was trying to win his fifth Gold medal. However, he left the games prematurely. Assumed is that the media pressure became too high at that moment. Paul took revenge by sailing two times more at the Olympics (1984 and 1988) in the Tornado. One of Paul's crewmembers from the Soling took the gold later. Valdemar Bandolowski together with 1972 Dragon helmsman Poul Richard Høj Jensen won the Gold in the Soling class in 1976 and 1980.
 Although favourable wind conditions in September were predicted. Some of the races suffered from lack of wind. In the Soling and Dragon only 6 races could be completed and the 6th race in the Finn only three contenders were able to finish in time.

Sailors 
During the sailing regattas at the 1972 Summer Olympics among others the following persons were competing in the various classes:
 Royalties
 , Prince of Thailand, Prinz Bhanubanda Bira in the Tempest
 , King of Norway, Crownprince Harald in the Soling
 , King of Spain, Sar Juan Carlos de Borbon in the Dragon
 Sportmanagers
 , Past President International Olympic Committee, Jacques Rogge in the Finn
 , Past president International Sailing Federation, Peter Tallberg in the Soling
 First non American winner of the America's Cup
 , John Bertrand in the Finn

Further reading

References

Sources
 
 
 

 
1972 Summer Olympics events
1972
1972 in sailing
20th century in Schleswig-Holstein
Sailing competitions in West Germany